The ceremonial county of Essex, which includes the unitary authorities of Southend-on-Sea and Thurrock, has returned 18 MPs to the UK Parliament since 2010.

As a result of the creation of Greater London under the London Government Act 1963, which came into effect on 1 April 1965, the boundaries of the historic/administrative county were significantly altered, with the south-western corner, representing a majority of its population and seats, being transferred to Greater London, forming the London Boroughs of Newham, Barking and Dagenham, Havering, Redbridge and Waltham Forest. This was reflected in the following redistribution of parliamentary seats which came into effect for the February 1974 general election and effectively reduced the county's representation from 26 to 12 MPs.

Number of seats 
The table below shows the number of MPs representing Essex at each major redistribution of seats affecting the county.

1Prior to 1950, seats were classified as County Divisions or Parliamentary Boroughs. Since 1950, they have been classified as County or Borough Constituencies.

Timeline

To 1965

Historic county (excluding Outer London area from 1885)

Outer London area (from 1885)

From 1965

Current ceremonial county 

1Epping contained the Municipal Borough of Chingford, which was incorporated into the London Borough of Waltham Forest in 1965. From 1974, this formed the basis of the new constituency of Chingford in Greater London.

Boundary reviews

See also 
 List of parliamentary constituencies in Essex

References 

Constituencies in England
Essex